"Mary" is a song by singer, songwriter, and pianist Tori Amos. First released as a B-side to UK pressings of her 1992 single "Crucify", it was later re-recorded for the compilation Tales of a Librarian and released as a digital single. Like many of Amos' singles, it was released digitally only but a promotional CD release was made for radio stations.

Background

"Mary" was one of the ten tracks originally sent to Atlantic Records for Amos' debut album, Little Earthquakes. However, upon Atlantic's rejection of these tracks, more songs were written and it did not appear on the final album. Like all of the B-sides from the sessions for Little Earthquakes, it was included on the bonus disc of the album's 2015 deluxe edition.

Amos re-recorded "Mary" (along with fellow Little Earthquakes B-side "Sweet Dreams") in 2003 for the compilation Tales of a Librarian, backed by her usual band. This version was released as a single to promote the album and received a promotional music video that is yet to see a commercial release.

Amos continued to play "Mary" live throughout her career up to the American Doll Posse tour, after which it was dropped except for a single performance during the Unrepentant Geraldines Tour.

Track listing

All songs written by Tori Amos.

 "Mary" (Radio edit) – 4:04
 "Mary" (Album version) – 4:40

Personnel

Tales of a Librarian version:

Musicians:

Tori Amos – Bösendorfer piano, lead vocals, backing vocals
Mac Aladdin – guitar
Jon Evans – bass, backing vocals
Matt Chamberlain – drums, backing vocals
Chelsea Laird – backing vocals
Alison Evans – backing vocals
Jon Astley – backing vocals
Duncan Pickford – backing vocals

Technical:

Tori Amos – production
Mark Hawley – recording, mixing
Marcel van Limbeek – recording, mixing

References

Tori Amos songs
Songs written by Tori Amos
1992 songs
2003 songs
2003 singles